Gunnar Magnus Johannesson (born 9 December 1964) is a professor at the Stockholm School of Economics, as well as a member of the Committee for the Prize in Economic Sciences in Memory of Alfred Nobel. He is known for his research in the field of experimental economics.

References

External links
Faculty page

Living people
1964 births
People from Eksjö Municipality
Swedish economists
Academic staff of the Stockholm School of Economics
Experimental economists
Linköping University alumni